Glenn Middleton (born 1 January 2000) is a Scottish professional footballer who plays as a winger for Scottish Premiership club Dundee United. He made 22 appearances for the Scotland under-21 team.

Early life
Born in Glasgow, Middleton was a keen supporter of Rangers as a child. His family relocated to the Northampton area in 2006, and he spent some time developing in the youth teams at Northampton Town.

Club career

Norwich City
Middleton joined Norwich City's Academy in 2012, graduating through their youth system. He was given the squad number 43 for the first team during the 2017–18 season and was also named in the squad as a substitute in a FA Cup 3rd round match against Southampton on 18 January 2017.

Rangers
Having found his senior opportunities limited at Norwich City, Middleton joined Rangers on 31 January 2018, reuniting with former Canaries youth coach Graeme Murty who was the Gers manager at the time of his arrival.

2018–19
Under Murty's successor Steven Gerrard, Middleton made his competitive debut for Rangers in a 2–0 win for Rangers against FK Shkupi in the Europa League on 12 July 2018 at Ibrox Stadium, with Middleton being widely praised for his performance on his debut. He scored his first goal for Rangers when he came on as a substitute in a 4–0 win against Dundee two months later. On 26 October, Middleton signed a five-year contract with Rangers that tied him to the club until the summer of 2023.

2019–20: Loans to Hibernian and Bradford
Middleton was loaned to Hibernian in August 2019. He made eight appearances for Hibernian, but none after 30 October, and the loan was curtailed on 27 December. He was then loaned to Bradford City on 31 January 2020 for the rest of the season.

2021–2022: Loans at St Johnstone
On 25 January 2021, Middleton joined St Johnstone on loan for the remainder of the season. He was cup-tied and missed out on  their victory in the 2020–21 Scottish League Cup, but then featured as the Saints also won the 2020–21 Scottish Cup. He returned on loan to McDiarmid Park in August 2021 and remained there for the whole season.

Dundee United
In July 2022, Middleton joined Dundee United from Rangers for an undisclosed transfer fee, on a three-year contract.

International career
Middleton has represented Scotland at several age levels, up to and including the under-21 team.

Selected for the Scotland under-21 squad in the 2018 Toulon Tournament, the team lost to Turkey in a penalty-out and finished fourth.

Career statistics

Honours 
St Johnstone

 Scottish Cup: 2020–21

References

External links

2000 births
Living people
Footballers from Glasgow
Footballers from Northampton
Scottish footballers
Scotland youth international footballers
Scotland under-21 international footballers
Association football wingers
Norwich City F.C. players
Rangers F.C. players
St Johnstone F.C. players
Dundee United F.C. players
Hibernian F.C. players
Bradford City A.F.C. players
Scottish Professional Football League players
English Football League players